The 1997 CFL Draft took place on Monday, April 7, 1997. 48 Canadian football players were chosen from 363 eligible Canadian universities as well as Canadian players playing in the NCAA.

The Ottawa Rough Riders folded following the 1996 CFL season, but any trades involving the club were still in effect. Since the Rough Riders finished last in the CFL, teams that received selections in trades picked first in those rounds, including the first overall pick. Conversely, the Hamilton Tiger-Cats traded their third round selection to the Rough Riders and that pick was subsequently forfeited. All other Ottawa selections were skipped.

Forfeitures
 Hamilton forfeited their sixth round selection after making a selection in the 1996 Supplemental Draft.

Round one

Round two

Round three

Round four

Round five

Round six

References 

Canadian College Draft
Cfl Draft, 1997